On the Ice is a 2011 American drama film written and directed by Andrew Okpeaha MacLean.  The film is set in (and was shot on location in) Utqiagvik, Alaska, MacLean's home town, and follows two Iñupiaq teenagers who, while on a seal hunt, accidentally kill one of their friends in a fight. Afraid of the consequences, they lie about his death and must grapple with their grief and guilt while attempting to keep their secret. The film is based upon an earlier work of MacLean's, Sikumi, which he released as a short film in 2008. On the Ice had its world premiere on January 21, 2011, at the Sundance Film Festival.

Synopsis
Three friends head out on the ice to hunt seal, but a fight breaks out, and one is killed. The two remaining friends, Qalli (Josiah Patkotak) and Aivaaq (Frank Qutuq Irelan), report the death as an accident out of fear and panic. As the Iñupiat community in isolated Utqiagvik, Alaska is close knit, this loss hits the town hard. Qalli struggles to deal with his own guilt and loss while weaving a wider web of lies to handle his father's suspicion and investigation of the day's events. Aivaaq is unable to handle his guilt. He turns to drug and alcohol abuse and lashes out at his friends. The movie focuses on the impact of guilt, secrets, and lies on the teens and their community. Like other examples of Native American Cinema, MacLean's work combines Hollywood filmmaking and Independent filmmaking style to tell a distinctive tribal story.

Cast
Josiah Patkotak as Qalli
Frank Qutuq Irelan as Aivaaq
Teddy Kyle Smith as Egasak
Adamina Kerr as Michelle
Sierra Jade Sampson as Uvlu
John Miller as James
Rosabelle Kunnanna Rexford as Aaka
Vernon Kanayurak as Roscoe
Billyjens Hopson as Jens
Jay Rapoza as Max
Allison Warden as Sigvaun
Denae Brower as Darlene
Tara Sweeney as Dora
Tasha Taaqpak Panigeo as Charlene
Jerica Aamodt as Ellie

Reception
Critical reception for On the Ice has been mixed. The film holds a rating of 59 on Metacritic (based on 12 reviews) and 64% on Rotten Tomatoes (based on 14 reviews). Despite this, the film has performed well at film festivals where it has received multiple awards. A reviewer for the New York Post called the film's polar setting "a perfect match for the [film's] noir tone" while also criticizing the movie's acting. A reviewer for The A.V. Club gave the movie a B+ rating, remarking "The performances, all from non-professional local actors, are noticeably uneven, but the film is as much a portrait of a place as it is a narrative, and cinematographer Lol Crawley shoots the white-on-white polar expanses like they’re vistas stretching to the ends of the earth—which in a way, they are." The late Roger Ebert praised the film for its suspense and finds the local actors convincing, noting that "guilt almost paralyzes Qalli".

Awards
Best First Feature at the Berlin International Film Festival (2011, won) 
Crystal Bear Award at the Berlin International Film Festival (2011, won) 
Haskell Wexler Award for Best Cinematography at the Woodstock Film Festival (2011, won) 
Jury Prize for Best Feature Film at the Woodstock Film Festival (2011, won)
Best New American Film at the Seattle International Film Festival (2011, won)
Best Director at the American Indian Film Festival (2011, won)
Best Film at the Cine Las Americas International Film Festival (2011, honorable mention)
Grand Jury Prize at the Sundance Film Festival (2011, nominated)

References

External links

2011 films
American drama films
2011 drama films
Inupiat-language films
Films set in Alaska
Films shot in Alaska
Films set in the Arctic
Inuit films
American independent films
2011 directorial debut films
2011 independent films
2010s English-language films
2010s American films